Justice League Unlimited (JLU) is an American superhero animated television series that was produced by Warner Bros. Animation and aired on Cartoon Network. Featuring a wide array of superheroes from the DC Comics universe, and specifically based on the Justice League superhero team, it is a direct sequel to the previous Justice League animated series and picks up around two years after it. JLU debuted on July 31, 2004, on Toonami and ended on May 13, 2006.

It is the eighth and final series of the DC Animated Universe, serving as the conclusion to a shared universe which began with Batman: The Animated Series. Much like its predecessor series, it is a prequel to Batman Beyond. Notably, it is the most continuity heavy show of the DC Animated Universe, and weaves together characters and plot lines from past series.

Justice League Unlimited received critical acclaim, with praise towards its writing, storylines, themes, voice acting, action scenes, and exploration of the larger DC universe.

Overview
According to animator Bruce Timm, the series finale of Justice League, "Starcrossed", was originally planned to be the final episode of the series; however, Cartoon Network ordered the production of a successor, titled Justice League Unlimited. Taking place shortly after its predecessor ended, it features a greatly expanded League, in which the characters from the original series—now referred to as "founding members"—are joined by many other superheroes from the DC Universe; in the first episode, well over 50 characters appear. A number of these were heroes who had made guest appearances in Justice League, but many heroes and other characters made their first animated appearances in this series. The general format of each episode is to have a small team assemble to deal with a particular situation, with a focus on both action and character interaction. This extension of the Justice League was originally planned to be explained in a planned direct-to-video feature film, but the project never materialized.

Stan Berkowitz, a member of the production team, left the show later for the TV series Friends and Heroes, and writer Matt Wayne was contracted to replace him. Most episodes tell a self-contained story, but the series also features extended story arcs, the first involving the growing conflict between the League and a secret government agency known as Project Cadmus. This plot line builds upon events that occurred during the second season of Justice League (which in turn built upon events in Batman: The Animated Series, Superman: The Animated Series, Batman Beyond, Static Shock, and The Zeta Project), and would go on to affect the plotlines of most of its episodes. It was resolved in a four-part story at the end of the second season of Justice League Unlimited. The third and final season story arc focuses on the new Secret Society (which is based on the Legion of Doom of the Challenge of the Super Friends season of Super Friends), a loose-knit organization formed to combat the increased superhero coordination of the first season. While the Secret Society is never referred to as the Legion of Doom, there were early plans to use the name (coined in typically comedic style by the Flash). The idea was rejected.

The series, along with the entire DC animated universe, was originally planned to end after the second-season finale "Epilogue", but a third season was greenlit by Cartoon Network. The third season started in 2005 with the episode "I Am Legion" (which was written before the announcement of a third season) and ended in 2006 with the episode "Destroyer". According to Matt Wayne, if the show had been renewed for a fourth season, he would have liked to write more episodes focusing on Superman and Wonder Woman.

Towards the end of the series, certain characters became off-limits to the show, like Blue Beetle and Hugo Strange. Characters associated with Batman and those who appeared in Batman: The Animated Series (aside from Batman himself) were restricted due to the unrelated animated series The Batman and Christopher Nolan's live-action The Dark Knight Trilogy, in order to avoid continuity confusion (although the villain the Clock King did make an appearance, he appeared as a member of Task Force X and did not interact with Batman). Aquaman and related characters were unavailable due to the development of a pilot for a live-action series featuring the character as a young man (planned to be a spin-off of Smallville). Characters from DC's "mature readers" Vertigo imprint were also not allowed, such as Swamp Thing and Phantom Stranger. No characters from the Teen Titans animated series appeared in JLU until after that show had been canceled (when Speedy appeared in the third-season episode "Patriot Act", which referenced the Seven Soldiers of Victory). While The Joker, Batman's archenemy, had appeared in the prior series' two parter "Wild Cards", he was restricted from appearing in Unlimited, due to the character's recurring role in WB's The Batman animated series, the same also applied to Clayface and Firefly, both of whom appeared in the previous series in a supporting capacity. Even Harley Quinn, who was originally created in the DC Animated Universe was also forbidden from appearing.

To compensate for this, the producers focused their stories on previously overlooked DC Comics characters. These included characters like Deadman, Warlord, and an unnamed modern equivalent of The Seven Soldiers of Victory.

DC Comics created an ongoing monthly comic book series based on the TV series, as part of its Johnny DC line of "all ages" comics, which did not have the same restrictions regarding character appearances.

Justice League Unlimited, like the second season of Justice League, is animated in widescreen. The show also features new theme music and intro (nominated for an Emmy). The two-part series finale was aired in the UK on February 8 and 18, 2006, and in the United States on May 6 and 13, 2006.

As in Justice League, romantic relationships develop between the characters across the course of the series. The Question and the Huntress, and Black Canary and Green Arrow are shown to be romantically involved, and a love-triangle between Green Lantern, Hawkgirl and Vixen develops (this is later complicated by the addition of Hawkman). Additionally, the series continually hints at a mutual attraction between Batman and Wonder Woman.

Episodes

Cast
 Amy Acker – Huntress
 Tomas Arana – Tharok
 Ed Asner –  Granny Goodness, Hephaestus
 Dee Bradley Baker – Blockbuster
 Adam Baldwin – Green Lantern (Hal Jordan), Jonah Hex, Rick Flag, Bonk
 Jason Bateman – Hermes
 Morena Baccarin – Black Canary
 Michael Beach – Mister Terrific, Devil Ray
 Jeff Bennett – Rick Wilson, Nazi Scientist
 Powers Boothe – Red Tornado, Gorilla Grodd
 Ben Browder – Bat Lash
 Clancy Brown – Lex Luthor, Guardians of the Universe
 Corey Burton – Aztek, Brainiac, Key, Sonar, Weather Wizard
 Maria Canals-Barrera – Shayera Hol, Justice Lord Hawkgirl, Fire 
 Néstor Carbonell – El Diablo
 Seymour Cassel – Chuck Sirianni
 Jeffrey Combs – Question, Doctor Moon
 Kevin Conroy – Batman / Bruce Wayne, Atom Smasher, Commander Steel, Crimson Avenger, Joe Chill
 Bud Cort – Toyman
 Chris Cox – Captain Atom, Shining Knight, Aztek (1st Voice)
 Matt Czuchry – Brainiac 5
 Olivia d'Abo – Morgaine Le Fey 
 Dana Delany – Lois Lane
 Alexis Denisof – Mirror Master
 Grey DeLisle – Downpour, Shifter
 John DiMaggio – Dreamslayer, Lord Havok
 Michael Dorn – Kalibak
 Robin Atkin Downes – Gentleman Ghost, Sinestro (in "Alive")
 Douglas Dunning – Deimos
 Héctor Elizondo – Hath-Set
 Robert Englund – Felix Faust
 Susan Eisenberg – Wonder Woman, Rampage
 Mike Erwin – Speedy
 Dennis Farina – Wildcat
 Oded Fehr – Doctor Fate
 Nathan Fillion  – Vigilante, Spy Smasher
 Farrah Forke – Big Barda
 Robert Forster – President of the United States
 Robert Foxworth – Professor Hamilton
 Will Friedle – Green Lantern (Kyle Rayner), Batman (Terry McGinnis)
 Donal Gibson – Captain Boomerang
 Ioan Gruffudd – Mister Miracle
 Paul Guilfoyle – Warlord
 Kim Mai Guest –  Linda Park, Silver Banshee
 Jennifer Hale – Zatanna, Bernadeth, Giganta, Killer Frost
 Mark Hamill – Trickster
 Shane Haboucha - Billy Batson
 Jason Hervey – Dove
 Michael Ironside – Darkseid
 Arte Johnson – Virman Vundabar
 Jonathan Joss – Pow Wow Smith
 Bob Joles – Hades
 Daniel Dae Kim – Metron
 Phil LaMarr – Green Lantern (John Stewart), Justice Lord Green Lantern,  Steel, S.T.R.I.P.E., Machiste, Static
 Juliet Landau – Zatanna (in "The Balance" Backward Voice), Plastique, Tala
 Lex Lang – Atomic Skull, Blue Devil, Captain Cold, Heat Wave
 Ted Levine – Sinestro
 Giselle Loren – Stargirl
 Lori Loughlin - Tracy Simmons
 Carl Lumbly – Martian Manhunter, Martian Manhunter (Justice Lord)
 Peter MacNicol – Chronos
 Virginia Madsen – Roulette
 Tim Matheson – Maxwell Lord
 Christopher McDonald – Jor-El
 Malcolm McDowell – Metallo
 John C. McGinley – Atom
 Dick Miller – Oberon
 George Newbern – Superman / Clark Kent, Justice Lord Superman, Bizarro, Evil Star
 Jerry O'Connell – Captain Marvel
 Peter Onorati – B'wana Beast, Warhawk
 Scott Patterson – King Faraday
 Ron Perlman – Orion
 Robert Picardo – Amazo
 Jeremy Piven – Elongated Man
 CCH Pounder – Amanda Waller
 Alan Rachins – Clock King
 Gregg Rainwater – Long Shadow
 Sheryl Lee Ralph – Cheetah
 James Remar – Hawkman, Shadow Thief
 Eric Roberts – Mongul 
 Michael Rosenbaum – Flash, Justice Lord Flash, Vigilante (in "Task Force X"), Deadshot, Doctor Polaris
 Scott Rummell – Aquaman
 Tom Everett Scott – Booster Gold
 Fred Savage – Hawk
 Raphael Sbarge – Deadman
 Glenn Shadix – Steven Mandragora
 Armin Shimerman – Professor Milo
 Kin Shriner – Green Arrow
 James Sie – Wind Dragon
 J. K. Simmons – General Wade Eiling, Mantis
 Mindy Sterling – Enid Clinton
 Susan Sullivan – Hippolyta
 Lauren Tom – Doctor Light, Green Lantern (Kai-Ro), Dana Tan 
 Nicholle Tom – Supergirl, Galatea
 Gina Torres – Vixen
 Hynden Walch – Ace
 Michael Jai White – Doomsday
 Marc Worden – Parasite (future version)
 Michael York – Ares
 Rachel York – Circe

Reception
Justice League Unlimited received critical acclaim and is listed as one of the best animated television shows of all time. IGN named Justice League/Justice League Unlimited as the 20th best animated television series of all time. Similarly, IndieWire also ranked the series as the 20th best animated show of all time.

James Whitbrook, editor of io9, wrote "Justice League Unlimited is simply the greatest superhero show of all time", further stating "it embraced its source material wholly, and was unafraid to be the wildest, biggest, comic-book-iest show it could be."

Home media
From 2006 to 2007, Warner Home Video (via DC Entertainment and Warner Bros. Family Entertainment) released the entire series of Justice League Unlimited on DVD. The series is presented in original broadcast presentation and story arc continuity order. The series was also released on Blu-Ray.

Warner Home Video also released another DVD set titled Justice League: The Complete Series. It contained all 91 episodes of Justice League and Justice League Unlimited on a 15-disc set with the 15th disc containing a bonus documentary. The same episodes were later sold as a 10-disc set without the bonus documentary.

Soundtrack
La-La Land Records released a 4-disc Justice League soundtrack on July 29, 2016. A potential Justice League Unlimited soundtrack depends on how well the Justice League soundtrack sells.

Adaptations

Justice League Unlimited
DC Comics published a series of 46-issue numbered comics based on the television series, between 2004 and 2008.
Justice League Unlimited: Jam-Packed Action! (2005-09-28): Adaptation of episodes 'Initiation' and 'For the Man Who Has Everything'.

Compilations
Justice League Unlimited Vol. 1: United They Stand (2005-05-18): Includes #1-5.
Justice League Unlimited Vol. 2: World's Greatest Heroes (2006-04-19): Includes #6-10.
Justice League Unlimited Vol. 3: Champions of Justice (2006-04-19): Includes #11-15.
Justice League Unlimited: The Ties That Bind (2008-04-09): Includes #16-22.
Justice League Unlimited: Heroes (2009-04-08): Includes #23-29.
Justice League Unlimited: Galactic Justice (2020-08-25, /): Includes #4, 6, 18, 24, 34, 46.
Justice League Unlimited: Time After Time (2020-11-03, /): Includes Adventures in the DC Universe #10, Justice League Adventures #28, 30, 34; Justice League Unlimited #9, 19.
Justice League Unlimited: Girl Power (2021-07-06, //EAN-5 50999): Includes Adventures in the DC Universe #6, 9; Justice League Adventures #4; Justice League Unlimited #20, 22, 35, 42; DC Super Hero Girls: Ghosting (preview).
Justice League Unlimited: Hocus Pocus (2021-01-27, /): Includes #11, 14, 25, 33, 37, 40.
DC Comics: Girls Unite!/DC Girls Unite (2021-11-02, /EAN-5 53999): Includes Batman Adventures: Cat Got Your Tongue?, Supergirl Adventures: Girl of Steel, Batman Adventures: Batgirl A League of Her Own, Justice League Unlimited: Girl Power

Justice League Infinity
It is a sequel to Justice League Unlimited, written by James Tucker and J.M. DeMatteis with art by Ethen Beavers. 7 numbered issues were published by DC Comics between 2021 and 2022.

Compilations
Justice League Infinity (2022-07-05): Includes #1-7.

Film
In 2019, Warner Bros. Animation released the film Justice League vs. the Fatal Five. While not officially confirmed by the studio, the creator of the DCAU and producer of the film Bruce Timm considers this film to take place in DCAU.

See also

 List of Justice League episodes
 Justice League: Worlds Collide, a canceled Justice League DTV feature.
 Justice League Unlimited toyline

Notes

References

External links

 DC page: TV series, comics (JLU), comics (JLI2021)
 
 
 Justice League Unlimited at The World's Finest
 

 
2004 American television series debuts
2006 American television series endings
2000s American animated television series
2000s American science fiction television series
Animated Batman television series
Unlimited
Animated television shows based on DC Comics
Cartoon Network original programming
Television series by Warner Bros. Animation
Toonami
American sequel television series
American children's animated action television series
American children's animated adventure television series
American children's animated science fantasy television series
American children's animated superhero television series
English-language television shows
Prejudice in fiction